In geometry, a set of lines is called equiangular if all the lines intersect at a single point, and every pair of lines makes the same angle.

Equiangular lines in Euclidean space 
Computing the maximum number of equiangular lines in n-dimensional Euclidean space is a difficult problem, and unsolved in general, though bounds are known. The maximal number of equiangular lines in 2-dimensional Euclidean space is 3: we can take the lines through opposite vertices of a regular hexagon, each at an angle 120 degrees from the other two. The maximum in 3 dimensions is 6: we can take lines through opposite vertices of an icosahedron. This upper bound is tight up to a constant factor to a construction by de Caen. The maximum in dimensions 1 through 16 is listed in the On-Line Encyclopedia of Integer Sequences as follows:

1, 3, 6, 6, 10, 16, 28, 28, 28, 28, 28, 28, 28, 28, 36, 40, ... 

In particular, the maximum number of equiangular lines in 7 dimensions is 28. We can obtain these lines as follows. The dot product of two of these vectors is 8 if both have a component 3 in the same place or −8 otherwise. Thus, the lines through the origin containing these vectors are equiangular. In fact, these 28 vectors and their negatives are, up to rotation and dilation, the 56 vertices of the 321 polytope. In other words, they are the weight vectors of the 56-dimensional representation of the Lie group E7.

Equiangular lines are equivalent to two-graphs.  Given a set of equiangular lines, let c be the cosine of the common angle.  We assume that the angle is not 90°, since that case is trivial (i.e., not interesting, because the lines are just coordinate axes); thus, c is nonzero.  We may move the lines so they all pass through the origin of coordinates.  Choose one unit vector in each line.  Form the matrix M of inner products.  This matrix has 1 on the diagonal and ±c everywhere else, and it is symmetric.  Subtracting the identity matrix I and dividing by c, we have a symmetric matrix with zero diagonal and ±1 off the diagonal.  This is the Seidel adjacency matrix of a two-graph. Conversely, every two-graph can be represented as a set of equiangular lines.

The problem of determining the maximum number of equiangular lines with a fixed angle in sufficiently high dimensions was solved by Jiang, Tidor, Yao, Zhang, and Zhao. The answer is expressed in spectral graph theoretic terms. Let  denote the maximum number of lines through the origin in  dimensions with common pairwise angle . Let  denote the minimum number (if it exists) of vertices in a graph whose adjacency matrix has spectral radius exactly . If  is finite, then  for all sufficiently large dimensions  (here the "sufficiently large" may depend on ). If no  exists, then .

Equiangular lines in complex vector space 
Unlike the real case described above, it is possible that this bound is attained in every dimension . A maximal set of complex equiangular lines is also known as a SIC or SIC-POVM.

Notes

 J. J. Seidel "Discrete non-Euclidean geometry" In Buekenhout (ed.), Handbook of Incidence Geometry, Elsevier, Amsterdam, The Nederlands (1995) claims, without proof, that the maximum number of equiangular lines in dimension 14 is 28. This was not known at the time.

References

  K. Hartnett (2017), "A new path to equiangular lines", Quanta Magazine.
 
  
 Brouwer, A.E., Cohen, A.M., and Neumaier, A.  Distance-Regular Graphs.  Springer-Verlag, Berlin, 1989.  Section 3.8.
 .  (See Chapter 11.)
 Gosselin, S., Regular two-graphs and equiangular lines, Master's thesis, Mathematics Department, University of Waterloo, 2004.
 
 
 
 
 

Euclidean geometry
Combinatorics